Neves Paulista is a municipality in the state of São Paulo, Brazil. The city has a population of 8,923 inhabitants and an area of 218.3 km².

Neves Paulista belongs to the Mesoregion of São José do Rio Preto.

References

Municipalities in São Paulo (state)